The Anii or Basila language (Bassila, Baseca, also known as Oji-Ouji, Ouinji-Ouinji,  Winji-Winji, though this is derogatory) is spoken in Benin, and central eastern Togo and central eastern Ghana. It is part of the geographic group of Ghana Togo Mountain languages (formerly known as the Togorestsprachen or Togo Remnant languages) of the Kwa branch of Niger–Congo.

There are four major dialect groups in Anii, which are quite different from each other, even to the point that some of the dialects are not mutually intelligible. These differences may include variation in phonology (including tonology), lexicon, syntax, and semantics.  There are significant differences from village to village within groups, particularly regarding pronunciation.

The name "Anii" was chosen in May 1979 by the Anii people as the official name for the language because it is a word that is common to all the Anii dialects.  It is an interjection meaning roughly ‘do you hear?’, or ‘do you understand?’ Some of the older names have colonial or derogatory connotations and should no longer be used, and just be kept for reference.

Like other languages of the Central-Togo group, Anii has a robust system of noun classes, contrasting with the reduced or absent systems of surrounding languages.  It also has a strong system of vowel harmony based on the feature [ATR]. The Bassila dialect, on which the most linguistic research has been done, has two phonological tone levels, low and high, and exhibits both grammatical and lexical tone.

Writing system

The letter D which was used in Anii Loanwords.

Classification
Anii is classified under the Niger-Congo, Atlantic-Congo and Kwa language groups.

Local names
The villages surrounding Bassila, the largest city in the region, have four alternative names for the Anii language and people: Gisida, Basila,  Bassila, and Baseca. Although the locals refer to the language by different names, these simply represent distinct Anii communities in that region.

History
The Anii people are a diverse group with approximately eighteen villages along the border region of Benin and Togo. Benin has the largest Anii population, with fifteen villages and 33,600 Anii, while Togo has three villages comprising roughly 12,300 residents and a significantly smaller community in Oti and Ashanti region Ghana. The Anii people are not originally from neither Togo nor Benin but are believed to have emigrated from Ghana, Cote d'Ivoire, Burkina Faso or Mali sometime before the 19th century. The different villages developed in relative isolation and developed their own names and dialect of Anii. It was not until 1979 and the Sous-Commission National Anii that the language was officially called Anii and a written alphabet was established. A full orthography was officially accepted by the community in 2012, and is being regularly used and taught.

Origin and use today
Although there are relatively few Anii speakers, the language has a comparatively strong presence among its speakers while the lingua franca, French is not as prevalent. Anii is the main language used in public and private domains, as some of its speakers, especially the elders, are not bilingual. A majority of the younger population still use Anii as their everyday language, and children are learning it as a first language.

Language risk 
Although there are relatively few speakers and within the speaker population there are many dialects, the language is becoming more popular among the population. This is due in part to government backed literacy courses. According to Ehnologue the language is classified as a 5 (developing).

Religion
In general, the Anii people ascribe to the Muslim faith, but Benin is very religiously diverse and there are also people of other faiths living in Anii communities.

Depending on the village: Arabic, Anii, Kotokoli, Tchamba or a combination of Arabic and Anii are used for preaching, and daily service. However, private prayer is always spoken in Anii.

Language structure
Anii has 14 noun classes, 23 consonant phonemes, and 11 vowel phonemes. It is tonal with both a high and low tone, and uses a modification of the Latin script that includes symbols from the International Phonetic Alphabet.

Research is considering the possibility that Anii is a tenseless language.  There is a far-past marker that may be a tense or a temporal remoteness marker.

Word lists
See Deborah Morton's dissertation The temporal and Aspectual Semantics and Verbal Tonology of Gisida Anii.

Noun list
This list contains English translated nouns with the accompanying tone pattern.

Verb list
This list contains English and French translated verbs with the accompanying tone pattern.

Dialects
There are four to five distinct dialect clusters that are geographically based. These dialects are distinct based on each group's relative physical isolation from one another and contact with other regional languages.

Additionally, there are significant differences in pronunciation between villages of the same dialect cluster. Each dialect has a varied set of rules including its lexicon, phonology, syntax, and TAM semantics. This has made it extremely difficult for linguists to document a unified set of grammatical rules for Anii.

There are two areas of nearly universal similarity between the dialects: the tone and pitch of the speaker and the influence of the lingua franca English and French.

Dialects of villages
 Giseda (Bassila, Benin) - the most prominent dialect, especially by adults 
 Gifolanga (Guiguizo, Benin)
 Frinyio ka gija (Frignion Village)
 Gikodowaraja (Kodowari village)
 Gipenesulja (Kemetou Penezoulou, Benin)
 Gipenelanja (Penelan, Benin)
 Naagayili ka gija (Nagayile village)
 Gibodija (Bodi, Benin)
 Gibayaakuja (Bayakou, Benin)
 Gideenguja (Dengou village)
 Ngmeelang ka gija (Agerendebou village)
 Giborokoja (Mboroko, Benin)
 Yaari ka gija (Yari, Benin)

See also
Ghana–Togo Mountain languages

References

 Bernd Heine, Die Verbreitung und Gliederung der Togorestsprachen. Berlin, Dietrich Reimer, 1968.
 M.E.Kropp Dakubu, editor, The Languages of Ghana, Kegan Paul International, 1988.
 Deborah Morton, "[ATR] Harmony in an Eleven Vowel Language: The Case of Anii". In:  Michael R. Marlo, Nikki B. Adams, Christopher R. Green, Michelle Morrison, and Tristan M. Purvis, Editors. Selected Proceedings of the 42nd Annual Conference on African Linguistics: African Languages in Context. Cascadilla Press, 2011.
Blench, R. (2001). Language: Anii. Retrieved February 12, 2016, from http://glottolog.org/resource/languoid/id/anii1245
Heine, Bernd. 1968. A preliminary survey of the noun classes of Bassila. Journal of African Languages 7. 1-13.
Zaske, S. (n.d.). Calendrier 2013 en langue anii. SIL Language and Culture Archives, 1-2. Retrieved February 12, 2016, from http://www.sil.org/africa/benin/show_work.asp?id=928474552183

External links
 http://www.endangeredlanguages.com/lang/3809
 http://gasana.org
 http://revue-gugu.org

Ghana–Togo Mountain languages
Languages of Ghana
Languages of Togo